Aserrío de Gariché is a corregimiento in Bugaba District, Chiriquí Province, Panama. Its population as of 1990 was 8,126; its population as of 2000 was 9,326.

References

Corregimientos of Chiriquí Province